The  (also Miyako Jima group) are a group of islands in Okinawa Prefecture, Japan, belonging to the Ryukyu Islands. They are situated between the Okinawa Island and Yaeyama Islands.

In the early 1870s, the population of the islands was estimated to number approximately 10,000. Miyako island has 55,914 people. A bridge connects Miyako Island to Ikema Island, which has 801 people. Tarama village has 1,214 people, between the two islands of Minna and Tarama.

Important Bird Area
The islands have been recognised as an Important Bird Area (IBA) by BirdLife International because they support populations of the resident Ryukyu green pigeons, as well as migrating whimbrels.

Inhabited islands
 Miyakojima City

 (ja)

 Tarama Village (Miyako District)

 (ja)

See also

Miyako people
Sakishima Islands
Miyakoan language
Miyako Strait

References

External links
 

 
Archipelagoes of Japan
Okinawa Islands
Islands of Okinawa Prefecture
Archipelagoes of the Pacific Ocean
Important Bird Areas of the Nansei Islands